The Portishead Open Lawn Tennis Tournament  was a Victorian period combined men's and women's grass court tennis tournament first staged September 1882, organised by Portishead Lawn Tennis Club and held at Portishead, Somerset, England. The tournament ended around 1890.

History
The Portishead Lawn Tennis was originally staged in July 1882 when it was held in conjunction with a Bazaar happening at the same time subsequently the event was thus co-promoted as the Lawn Tennis and Bazaar at Portishead.

The Bristol based Western Daily Express reported on this event as follows.
.

On 12 September 1883 the Portishead Open Lawn Tennis Tournament was officially established, at the first meeting of this tournament  Charles Lacy Sweet won the men's  singles title, against Lionel Wilberforce the brother of Herbert Wilberforce, the men's doubles was won by Charles Lacy Sweet and Mr. Pontifex defeating William Parkfield Wethered and F.E. Gibbs. The women's singles was won Miss Bryant, the women's doubles were won by Miss Reynolds and Miss Reynolds who defeated Miss Arden and Miss A. Lys, and the mixed doubles title was won by William Renshaw and Miss Arden who defeated Charles Lacy Sweet and Miss  Miss A. Lys.

The inaugural open tournament received more positive reporting the following year in 1883.
.

After the success of the 1883 tournament this event started to attract top players, and ever increasing attendances, and was held up to at least 1890.

The Western Daily Express once again reporting in 1887.
.

References

Sources
 Bristol Times and Mirror. (Friday 12 September 1890). Portishead Lawn Tennis Open Tournament. Bristol, Somerset. England.
 Routledges Sporting Annual (1883) Lawn Tennis Tournaments of 1882. George Routledge and Son. London.
 Western Daily Press. (Monday 31 August 1885). Portishead Open Lawn Tennis Tournament. Bristol, Somerset. England.

Defunct tennis tournaments in the United Kingdom
Grass court tennis tournaments